Aurora Airport may refer to:

 Aurora Municipal Airport (Illinois) in Aurora, Illinois, United States (FAA: ARR, IATA: AUZ)
 Aurora Municipal Airport (Nebraska) or Al Potter Field in Aurora, Nebraska, United States (FAA: AUH)
 Aurora State Airport in Aurora, Oregon, United States (FAA: UAO)
 Jerry Sumners Sr. Aurora Municipal Airport in Aurora, Missouri, United States (FAA: 2H2)
 La Aurora International Airport in Guatemala City, Guatemala (IATA: GUA, ICAO: MGGT)

Airports in places named Aurora
 Buckley Space Force Base in Aurora, Colorado, United States (FAA/IATA: BKF)
 Aurora Airpark, former airport in Aurora, Colorado

See also
 Aurora (disambiguation)